The 2017–18 BLNO was the 18th season of the Basketball League of Norway since its establishment. It started on 22 September 2017 and ended on 11 April 2018 with the third and last game of the finals.

Kongsberg Miners, in their third season in the league, won the title defended by Centrum Tigers, that ended in the last position.

Format
The ten participating teams first played the regular season, that consisted in a round-robin schedule containing three rounds with every team playing each opponent at least once home and once away for a total of 27 matches.

At the end of the regular season, the top eight teams qualified for the playoffs. Quarterfinals and semifinals were played with a best-of-three format and the final is played as a single game.

The last qualified team would be relegated.

Team Changes
Persbråten were relegated at the end of the last season, replaced by Fyllingen.

Teams

Regular season

Playoffs

Awards
The individual awards and the All-League team were chosen by the coaches of the League.

Individual awards

All-BLNO team

References

External links
Official Norwegian Basketball Federation website

BLNO
Norway
Basketball
Basketball